ZC45 and ZXC21, sometimes known as the Zhoushan virus, are two bat-derived strains of severe acute respiratory syndrome–related coronavirus. They were collected from least horseshoe bats (Rhinolophus pusillus) by personnel from military laboratories in the Third Military Medical University (Chongqing, China) and the Research Institute for Medicine of Nanjing Command (Nanjing, China) between July 2015 and February 2017 from sites in Zhoushan, Zhejiang, China, and published in 2018. These two virus strains belong to the clade of SARS-CoV-2, the virus strain that causes COVID-19, sharing 88% nucleotide identity at the scale of the complete virus genome.

References 

SARS-CoV-2
Bat virome
Coronaviridae
Animal virology
Sarbecovirus
Zoonoses